Juz may refer to:

 juz', one of the thirty parts into which Quran is sometimes divided
 jüz, one of the three main territorial divisions in the Kypchak Plain area that covers much of the contemporary Kazakhstan:
 Senior jüz
 Middle jüz
 Junior jüz
 Juz Entertainment, an artist agency and record label in Kazakhstan
 Jowz (also Romanized as Juz), a village in Iran
 Quzhou Airport, in Zhejiang Province, China (IATA airport code JUZ)